Ivan Miller (30 December 1913 – 6 May 1966) was an Australian cricketer. He played four first-class cricket matches for Victoria between 1933 and 1936.

See also
 List of Victoria first-class cricketers

References

External links
 

1913 births
1966 deaths
Australian cricketers
Victoria cricketers
Cricketers from Melbourne